Labib Hussein Abu Rokan (born 1911, died 20 November 1989) was a Druze Israeli politician who served as a member of the Knesset for Cooperation and Brotherhood between 1959 and 1961.

Biography
Abu Rokan was born in Isfiya during the Ottoman era. During the Arab revolt in the late 1930s, he was involved in establishing links with Abba Hushi (secretary of Haifa Workers Council) and the Haganah, and was also a member of the Histadrut-affiliated Union of Workers in Eretz Yisrael.

During the 1948 Arab-Israeli War he recruited Druze volunteers to fight in the Israel Defense Forces. Following the war, he helped establish co-operative groups in Druze and Arab villages, including Bustan, which sold vegetables. In 1950 he became head of Isfiya local council, holding the role until 1959, when he was elected to the Knesset. Although the party retained its two-seat strength in the 1961 elections, both Abu Rokan and Yussef Diab lost their seats.

In 1963 he was appointed Qadi of the Druze Religious Court, and in 1980 became a qadi in the Druze Religious Appeals Court.

He died in 1989.

References

External links
 

1911 births
1989 deaths
Arab people in Mandatory Palestine
Cooperation and Brotherhood politicians
Druze members of the Knesset
Israeli Druze
20th-century Israeli judges
Israeli trade unionists
Members of the 4th Knesset (1959–1961)
People from Isfiya